Great Science-Fiction was a science fiction short story anthology edited by Tony Licata, published in 1965.

The title was originally conceived of as "The Bizarre." It was changed by the publisher to the more generic and 'safer' Great Science Fiction. There was concern about possible censorship at the time. Bizarre was an adjective often used in sex ads and the publisher also published The National Insider which ran personal ads. Clearly the word bizarre was not one that could be used in a personal ad. 

The stories by some of the top writers that I had encountered at the time (early '60s) lived up to my original title.

Contents 
The Wind by Ray Bradbury
Mouse by Fredric Brown
The Golem by Avram Davidson
Judgment Day by L. Sprague de Camp
History Lesson by Arthur C. Clarke
The Ruum by Arthur Porges
Dark Mission by Lester del Rey
A Better Rat Trap by Brad Steiger

External links 
 Great Science-Fiction listing at ISFDB

1965 anthologies
Science fiction anthology series